Eric Werner Reschke (born 1965) is an American businessman and Republican politician currently serving in the Oregon House of Representatives. He represents the 56th district, which covers southern Klamath County and southwestern Lake County, including  Klamath Falls, Lakeview, Malin, Merrill, Bonanza, and several unincorporated communities in Klamath County.

Biography
Reschke was born in Los Angeles, California (1965), grew up in Beaverton, Oregon and graduated from Sunset High School (1983). He graduated from Oregon State University (1988) with a Bachelor of Arts Degree in Business Administration. After graduation he worked for Georgia-Pacific, Tektronix, and Xerox in the Portland metropolitan area before moving to Klamath County in 2001.

Reschke was a board member of the Klamath County Chamber of Commerce from 2012 until 2016 and was elected to the Oregon State House in 2016. In the election, he earned 48.77% of the vote, defeating Democratic candidate (and former Klamath County Commissioner) Al Switzer and non-affiliated candidate Jonah Hakanson. In 2018 Reschke was reelected earning 71.8% of the vote over Democratic challenger Taylor Tupper. In 2020 Reschke was re-elected earning 71.7% of the vote over Democratic challenger Faith Leith.

On December 11, 2020, Reschke and 11 other state Republican officials signed a letter requesting Oregon Attorney General Ellen Rosenblum join Texas and other states contesting the results of the 2020 presidential election in Texas v. Pennsylvania. Rosenblum announced she had filed in behalf of the defense, and against Texas, the day prior.

Personal life
Reschke is married and has one son. The family attends Calvary Chapel Church in Klamath Falls.

References

External links
 Campaign website
 Legislative website

Politicians from Beaverton, Oregon
Politicians from Klamath Falls, Oregon
Republican Party members of the Oregon House of Representatives
21st-century American politicians
Judson College (Alabama) alumni
Oregon State University alumni
1965 births
Living people
Date of birth missing (living people)
Sunset High School (Beaverton, Oregon) alumni